Joseph Albert Rosario, M.S.F.S (30 May 1915 – 31 July 2011) was an Indian prelate of the Roman Catholic Church. He was one of oldest Roman Catholic Bishops and the oldest Bishop from India.

Rosario was born in Nagpur, India on 30 May 1915. He was ordained priest on 29 September 1944  in the religious institute of the Missionaries of St. Francis de Sales. Appointed on 8 May 1955 to the Diocese of Amravati, he was ordained bishop on 13 November 1955, retiring from governance of the see on 1 April 1995.

Popularity
Bishop Rosario was very popular among the non-Catholic masses of Amravati. He was particularly known in the region for his tolerance for other religions.

External links
Catholic-Hierarchy

References

1915 births
2011 deaths
20th-century Roman Catholic bishops in India
Participants in the Second Vatican Council